Gray sex may refer to:
 Gray asexuality
 Gray rape